Ballo Wharf, commonly known as Ballowharf, is a community in Northern Province, Sierra Leone, north of the capital Freetown.

References

Populated places in Sierra Leone
Northern Province, Sierra Leone